Jaladeran (also Romanized as Jalāderān and Jalādarān; also known as Jalālābād) is a village in Qahab-e Jonubi Rural District, in the Central District of Isfahan County, Isfahan Province, Iran. At the 2006 census, its population was 301, in 75 families.

References 

Populated places in Isfahan County